Riegsee is a municipality in the district of Garmisch-Partenkirchen, in Bavaria, Germany.  The town lies on Riegsee Lake, of the same name.

Names
The name Riegsee derives from the personal name Ruodgis and the Old High German word for "lake", sê(o).  Attested historical forms of the name include Ruodgise (1050–c. 1065), Rvodgisisse (1052–55), Roueggese (c. 1065–75), Ruodkisesse/Rotkisesse (1152–53), Ruetgisse (1193–95), Ruggessê (1193–95), Roͮikisse (12th century), Rovchse (c. 1200), Rügsee (14th century), Rugksee (1403), Ruexsee (1431), Rügksee (1501), Riechsee (c. 1583), and Riegsee (1629).

References

Garmisch-Partenkirchen (district)